Robin Nahas (born 10 November 1987) is a professional Australian rules footballer who played for the Richmond Football Club and the North Melbourne Football Club in the Australian Football League (AFL).

Early career 
Nahas played his junior football with the Oakleigh Dragons Football Club which is located in Oakleigh South and competed in the Moorabbin Saints Junior Football League (MSJFL), he then went on to play for the Oakleigh Chargers in the TAC Cup. In 2006 Nahas joined the Port Melbourne Football Club in the Victorian Football League (VFL) and he spent three seasons at the club. Prior to being drafted, Robin won the 2008 Fothergill-Round Medal, awarded to the most promising young talent in the VFL. Nahas is known for his exceptional pace and ferocious tackling, despite his small size, being 176 cm tall.  At the time of the draft, Nahas weighed in at 60 kg before increasing his weight during pre-season with Richmond.

AFL career 
In 2009, Nahas was selected with pick number 8 in the 2009 Rookie Draft by Richmond.

Richmond
He made his AFL debut in round 2, 2009, replacing captain Kane Johnson, who was placed on the long-term injury list with a knee injury. Nahas had an impressive first year with the Tigers, which was capped off with him claiming the "best first-year player" award at the Richmond best-and-fairest presentation. Nahas kicked 5 goals against Port Adelaide in his 6th game, earning 2 Brownlow votes, and also won a Brownlow vote for a 19-disposal, 4-goal game against the Crows in Round 14.

Nahas played 14 games in 2010, dropped after the first two games for a lack of defensive pressure. He returned to the side in round 5 but had a moderate season overall, as did many Richmond players in Damien Hardwick's first year in charge. 2011 was a break-out year for Nahas, he played every game and performed well in a more midfield-oriented role, in addition to stints in attack. Nahas averaged 19 disposals per game and kicked 29 goals for the season, fourth-highest for the club and tied for sixth in the Jack Dyer Medal. He was offered a two-year contract at the end of the year and was also selected in the Australian International Rules squad, scoring an 'over' in the First Test. In 2012 Nahas again played every game but was a little inconsistent. He kicked 34 goals for the season, an improvement on the previous year and second-best for the club, but his disposals-per-game was down with an average of 13.5. Nahas struggled in 2013, with increased competition for his spot in the side. Dropped following the opening game against Carlton where he managed just 3 touches, Nahas played only 6 games for the year. At the end of the season Nahas was told Richmond would not be offering him a new contract. Richmond delisted Nahas in late October 2013 but he was signed by North Melbourne a few weeks later, as a delisted free agent.

North Melbourne
Nahas made his debut for North Melbourne in round 4 against the Sydney Swans at the SCG. He was a late replacement for second ruck man  Daniel Currie who was omitted due to the wet weather. He did not make the squad for the subsequent game against Collingwood but returned for North Melbourne's away win against Fremantle. In Round 12 he played his first game against old club Richmond. On 31 October 2014, it was announced that Nahas had been delisted by North Melbourne.
Nahas was rookied by North Melbourne in the 2015 AFL Rookie Draft and played 18 games in 2015, including his 100th AFL game against the West Coast in round 10. At the conclusion of the 2016 season, he was delisted by North Melbourne after playing only eight games and kicking four goals during the year.

VFL career

Port Melbourne 
After being delisted by North Melbourne, Nahas returned to Port Melbourne for the 2017 VFL season, also being appointed as the forward coach. He was allocated the number 28, and was key contributor to the teams premiership victory in 2017. Nahas retired from VFL football at the end of 2018, having played a total of 93 senior games for the club spanning a total of five seasons.

Statistics

|- style="background-color: #EAEAEA"
! scope="row" style="text-align:center" | 2009
|style="text-align:center;"|
| 38 || 19 || 21 || 21 || 162 || 105 || 267 || 75 || 75 || 1.1 || 1.1 || 8.5 || 5.5 || 14.1 || 3.9 || 3.9
|-
! scope="row" style="text-align:center" | 2010
|style="text-align:center;"|
| 26 || 14 || 13 || 13 || 85 || 90 || 175 || 41 || 64 || 0.9 || 0.9 || 6.1 || 6.4 || 12.5 || 2.9 || 4.6
|- style="background-color: #EAEAEA"
! scope="row" style="text-align:center" | 2011
|style="text-align:center;"|
| 26 || 22 || 29 || 11 || 212 || 209 || 421 || 89 || 94 || 1.3 || 0.5 || 9.6 || 9.5 || 19.1 || 4.0 || 4.3
|-
! scope="row" style="text-align:center" | 2012
|style="text-align:center;"|
| 26 || 22 || 34 || 17 || 170 || 126 || 296 || 58 || 83 || 1.5 || 0.8 || 7.7 || 5.7 || 13.5 || 2.6 || 3.8
|- style="background-color: #EAEAEA"
! scope="row" style="text-align:center" | 2013
|style="text-align:center;"|
| 26 || 6 || 3 || 1 || 28 || 19 || 47 || 16 || 11 || 0.5 || 0.2 || 4.7 || 3.2 || 7.8 || 2.7 || 1.8
|-
! scope="row" style="text-align:center" | 2014
|style="text-align:center;"|
| 28 || 8 || 7 || 9 || 68 || 44 || 112 || 34 || 29 || 0.9 || 1.1 || 8.5 || 5.5 || 14.0 || 4.3 || 3.6
|- style="background-color: #EAEAEA"
! scope="row" style="text-align:center" | 2015
|style="text-align:center;"|
| 28 || 18 || 24 || 9 || 139 || 106 || 245 || 67 || 57 || 1.3 || 0.5 || 7.7 || 5.9 || 13.6 || 3.7 || 3.2
|-
! scope="row" style="text-align:center" | 2016
|style="text-align:center;"|
| 28 || 8 || 4 || 9 || 43 || 30 || 73 || 19 || 27 || 0.5 || 1.1 || 5.4 || 3.8 || 9.1 || 2.4 || 3.4
|- class="sortbottom"
! colspan=3| Career
! 117
! 135
! 90
! 907
! 729
! 1636
! 399
! 440
! 1.2
! 0.8
! 7.8
! 6.2
! 14.0
! 3.4
! 3.8
|}

Personal life 
Nahas was born in Australia to Lebanese parents. He attended Salesian College in Chadstone. In January 2013 Nahas was involved in an incident where he chased down and detained a bag-snatcher in Prahran.

References

External links

Port Melbourne Football Club players
Richmond Football Club players
North Melbourne Football Club players
Living people
1987 births
Australian people of Lebanese descent
Australian rules footballers from Victoria (Australia)
Oakleigh Chargers players
Werribee Football Club players
North Ballarat Football Club players
Australia international rules football team players
People educated at Salesian College (Chadstone)